Kurdistan University of Medical Sciences is a public university in Sanandaj, Iran. The university has five faculties including medicine, dentistry, health care, nursing, and paramedicine and 38 Departments within the University Campus offering different courses including B.Sc., B.E., Non-continuous B.Sc., M.Sc., M.Tech., M.D., Specialist, Subspecialist, PhD, PhD by Research, and Postdoc.

References

External links
 "Official Website of the Kurdistan University of Medical Sciences"

Kurdistan, University of Medical Sciences
Kurdistan, University of Medical Sciences
Education in Kurdistan Province
Buildings and structures in Kurdistan Province
1986 establishments in Iran